James Frances Whelan (May 11, 1890 – November 29, 1929) was a Major League Baseball player. In the minor leagues, he played several different positions, most often third base.

Sources

St. Louis Cardinals players
Junction City Soldiers players
Ogden Canners players
Indianapolis Indians players
Minneapolis Millers (baseball) players
Topeka Jayhawks players
Denver Bears players
Evansville Evas players
Muskegon Reds players
Muskegon Muskies players
Baseball players from Kansas
1890 births
1929 deaths